Communal elections were held in Cambodia on 5 June 2022. It was the fifth quinquennial communal election in Cambodia since 2002. 1,652 communes in all 25 provinces of Cambodia were contested for a total of 11,622 commune council seats. The election precedes the 2023 general election and the 2024 Senate election. 9.2 million of 10.5 million eligible voters were registered to cast their ballots. Voter turnout was 80.3%. 

The result was a landslide victory for the Cambodian People's Party which won 74% of the popular vote, 1,648 commune chiefs, and more than 9,000 commune councillors. The resurgent Candlelight Party, a faction of the disbanded Cambodia National Rescue Party, won 22% of the popular vote, but only 4 commune chiefs. It also marked the first time ever that no party was led by either Sam Rainsy, Kem Sokha, and Norodom Ranariddh. The aftermath of the election was marked by continued arrests of opposition supporters.

Background
The main opposition Cambodia National Rescue Party was dissolved in November 2017 following the communal elections.

Major parties contesting

82,786 candidates from 17 political parties contested the election according to the National Election Committee (NEC). The Cambodian People's Party (CPP) had fielded candidates in all 1,652 communes, followed by the Candlelight Party at 1,632 communes, and FUNCINPEC at 688 communes.

Parties contesting the elections:

Beehive Social Democratic Party
Cambodia Reform Party
Cambodian Democratic Indigenous People’s Party
Cambodian Nation Love Party
Cambodian Nationality Party
Cambodian People's Party
Cambodian Youth Party
Candlelight Party
FUNCINPEC
Grassroots Democratic Party
Kampucheaniyum Party
Khmer Economic Development Party
Khmer National United Party
Khmer United Party
Khmer Will Party
Reaksmey Khemara Party

Results

References

2022 elections in Asia 
Communal elections in Cambodia
2022 in Cambodia